Mantare is one of 18 wards of the Kwimba District of the Mwanza Region in Tanzania. It is located at 33° 13' E, 2° 42' S. Like many of its neighboring wards, Mantare is inhabited by the Wasukuma people who speak Kisukuma and Swahili, the national language of Tanzania.

The landscape is quite rural, and much of the farmland is used for growing rice, corn, cassava, and cotton. Most of the inhabitants are subsistence farmers, though a few work in the institutions found in the nearby village of Sumve.

Railways
Mantare is the name of a train stop on the Tanzania Railways Corporation (TRC) line to Dar es Salaam, though the stop is actually found in the neighboring village of Ishingisha. The stop is approximately 53 km to the terminus of the line in Mwanza.

Sport
Mantare, Sumve, and Ishingisha are all members of the Goat League, where each local soccer team competes against each other in a round robin tournament for the prize of a goat.

Wards of Mwanza Region